Institute of Hotel Management, in Jaipur is a college offering training in the hospitality industry.  The Institute is governed by the National Council for Hotel Management and Catering Technology set up by the Indian Ministry of Tourism.

Affiliation
The institute is affiliated to National Council for Hotel Management & Catering Technology, Noida under the Ministry of Tourism, Govt. of India to conduct the various courses under their umbrella. NCHMCT has signed an MOU with Indira Gandhi National Open University, New Delhi and the B.Sc. in Hotel & Hospitality Administration Degree is awarded by IGNOU and the course is conducted by NCHMCT, Noida at all the 51 institutes under it.

Vegetarian Option
In 2016, IHMCTAN Jaipur (along with IHMCTAN Ahmedabad and IHMCTAN Bhopal) started giving a student the option to choose only vegetarian cooking. This decision to offer a vegetarian option by IHMCTAN Jaipur may be the first amongst any of the hospitality training institutes of the world. In 2018, the National Council for Hotel Management (NCHM) announced that a vegetarian option would be provided at all IHMCTANs.

References

External links
 Official Website

Hospitality schools in India
Universities and colleges in Jaipur
Ministry of Tourism (India)
Institute of Hotel Management
Educational institutions in India with year of establishment missing